Patriarch Joanikije may refer to:

 Joanikije II, first Serbian Patriarch (1346–1354)
 Joanikije III, Serbian Patriarch (1739–1746)